Rosemary Olivia Wright (née Stirling, born 11 December 1947) is a former British sprinter and middle-distance runner. She won a gold medal in the 4 × 400 m relay at the 1969 European Championships, and a gold medal in the 800m at the 1970 Commonwealth Games. Her 800m best of 2:00.15, stood as the Scottish record for 30 years (1972-2002).

Career
Born in Timaru, Canterbury, New Zealand to a Scottish father and English mother, she moved with her family to Wolverhampton, England as a teenager where she joined the Wolverhampton Harriers. At the age of 16 she was one of the best British female runners over 800 metres. In the British Empire and Commonwealth Games in 1966 in Kingston, Jamaica she competed for Scotland over 440 yards and 880 yards and finished in fourth place in both events. In 1969 she won the Bronze medal in the 400m at the European Indoor Games in Belgrade. She also competed at the 1969 European Championships in Athletics in Athens, Greece, placing eighth in the 400 metres final and, with teammates Pat Lowe, Janet Simpson and Lillian Board, helping Great Britain win gold in the 4 x 400-metres relay in world record time (3:30.8) .

At the 1970 Commonwealth Games in Edinburgh she won gold in the 800 metres race. At the European Indoor Athletics Championships in 1971 in Sofia, she was awarded the 800m Bronze medal behind Hildegard Falck and Ileana Silai. She also won Bronze the same year at the European Championships in Helsinki. At the 1972 Summer Olympics in Munich she finished seventh in the 800 metres with a personal best time of 2:00.15 that lasted as a UK record until 1979. In 1974, at the British Commonwealth Games in Christchurch, New Zealand she was a member of the Scottish relay team that finished fourth. At the European Indoor Championships in Gothenburg she finished in fourth place in the 800 m.

Rosemary married her English-born husband, Trevor Wright who ran for New Zealand, having met him while competing in Helsinki in 1971. She lived in Wolverhampton until the age of 34, when the couple moved to New Zealand.

References

1947 births
Living people
Sportspeople from Timaru
Sportspeople from Wolverhampton
British female sprinters
Scottish female sprinters
Scottish female middle-distance runners
Commonwealth Games medallists in athletics
Commonwealth Games gold medallists for Scotland
Athletes (track and field) at the 1966 British Empire and Commonwealth Games
Athletes (track and field) at the 1970 British Commonwealth Games
Athletes (track and field) at the 1974 British Commonwealth Games
Olympic athletes of Great Britain
Athletes (track and field) at the 1972 Summer Olympics
New Zealand emigrants to the United Kingdom
Olympic female sprinters
Anglo-Scots
New Zealand people of Scottish descent
Medallists at the 1970 British Commonwealth Games